= Kolua Khurd =

- village
- Location within Madhya Pradesh Location within India
- Coordinates: 23.2529503°N 77.5565683°E
- Country: India
- State: Madhya Pradesh
- District: Bhopal
- Tehsil: Huzur
- Elevation: 454 m (1,490 ft)

Population (2011)
  - Total: 505
- Time zone: UTC+5:30 (IST)
- ISO 3166 code: MP-IN
- 2011 census code: 482434

Kolua Khurd is a village in the Bhopal district of Madhya Pradesh, India. It is located in the Huzur tehsil and the Phanda block.

== Demographics ==
According to the 2011 census of India, Kolua Khurd has 110 households. The effective literacy rate (i.e. the literacy rate of population excluding children aged 6 and below) is 81.15%.

Demographics (2011 Census)
	Total	Male	Female
Population	505	264	241
Children aged below 6 years	70	35	35
Scheduled caste	109	61	48
Scheduled tribe	6	3	3
Literates	353	203	150
Workers (all)	212	131	81
Main workers (total)	170	120	50
Main workers: Cultivators	43	36	7
Main workers: Agricultural labourers	20	16	4
Main workers: Household industry workers	0	0	0
Main workers: Other	107	68	39
Marginal workers (total)	42	11	31
Marginal workers: Cultivators	1	1	0
Marginal workers: Agricultural labourers	2	2	0
Marginal workers: Household industry workers	0	0	0
Marginal workers: Others	39	8	31
Non-workers	293	133	160
